The Day a Pig Fell Into the Well (돼지가 우물에 빠진 날, Dwaejiga umul-e ppajin nal) is a 1996 Korean drama film and the directorial debut of Hong Sang-soo. It stars Bang Eun-hee, Jo Eun-sook, Park Jin-song, Lee Eung-kyung and Kim Eui-sung. It was also the feature film debut of Song Kang-ho. The title derives from a 1954 book by John Cheever.

Hong earned the Best Director award at the Korean Blue Dragon Film Awards for his work as well as awards at Rotterdam and Vancouver.

Synopsis
The plot focuses on the desires and lives of four characters in diverse circumstances: a poor novelist, a cheating wife, her germophobic husband, and a ticket girl.

References

External links 
 
 
 Korean films of 1996 at koreanfilm.org
 Cine21 profile

Bibliography
 
  see p. 133

1996 films
1996 drama films
Films directed by Hong Sang-soo
1990s Korean-language films
South Korean drama films
1996 directorial debut films